Daniel Paisner is an American journalist, author, and podcaster. He is best known for his work as a ghostwriter and collaborator.  He has published more than sixty books, including fourteen New York Times best-sellers. He is also the author of three novels, and several works of non-fiction.  His novel A Single Happened Thing was published by Relegation Books in March 2016.  His titles include The Girl in the Green Sweater: A Life in Holocaust's Shadow (2008), The Power of Broke (2016), and Last Man Down (2002).

Paisner hosts the podcast As Told To, in which he interviews other authors about their experiences ghostwriting and collaborating with notable figures.

Early life 

Paisner graduated from Tufts University with a B.A. in English in 1982, before receiving an M.A. in Journalism from Boston University.

Career 

In 2006, Paisner collaborated with Holly Robinson Peete on the book Get Your Own Damn Beer, I'm Watching the Game!: A Woman's Guide to Loving Pro Football, which won that year's Quill Award in the Sports category. He co-wrote Ivanka Trump's first self-help book, The Trump Card: Playing to Win in Work and Life, published in October 2009.

In 2011, Paisner collaborated with baseball umpire Jim Joyce and pitcher Armando Galarraga on a book about Galarraga's near perfect game.  On June 2, 2010, Joyce called a play incorrectly, preventing Galarraga from pitching a perfect game.  Following the release of the book, Nobody's Perfect: Two Men, One Call, and a Game for Baseball History, MLB did not allow Joyce to work any games in which Galarraga would be playing, to avoid any appearance of impropriety due to their business relationship.

In 2016, with Daymond John, the founder and CEO of FUBU, Paisner released The Power of Broke, a motivational business book that features stories from 15 entrepreneurs, including Steve Aoki, Rob Dyrdek, Kevin Plank, and Loren Ridinger.  It appeared on The Wall Street Journal and The New York Times bestseller lists, and received an NAACP Image Award for Outstanding Instructional Literary Work.

References

1960 births
21st-century American biographers
20th-century American educators
21st-century American historians
21st-century American male writers
American political writers
Ghostwriters
Educators from New York (state)
Tufts University School of Arts and Sciences alumni
Boston University College of Communication alumni
Living people
21st-century American educators
20th-century American biographers
American male non-fiction writers